Crazy Money is a 1981 Soviet comedy and historical film.

The film was directed by Yevgeny Matveyev, produced by Yevgeny Matveyev, and composed by Evgueni Ptitchkine; Aleksandr Yakovlevich Mikhailov starred.  Based on a play of the same name by Alexander Ostrovsky, the 87-minute film was put out by Mosfilm.

References

External links
 

1981 films
Mosfilm films
Soviet historical comedy films